Stegea simplicialis is a moth in the family Crambidae. It is found in North America, where it has been recorded from Arizona and Texas.

The length of the forewings is 6–9 mm. Adults are on wing from July to August.

References

Moths described in 1907
Glaphyriinae